Kimberly Smith (born January 28, 1968) is a retired female professional cyclist from the United States.

References

1968 births
Living people
American female cyclists
21st-century American women